Suspension is a 2007 American science-fiction film directed by Alec Joler and Ethan Shaftel. In 2007, Suspension won the 'Spirit of the Independents' Award at the Ft Lauderdale Film Festival. It received a special opening night preview screening at the Sedona International Film Festival, and competed at the Sci Fi London Festival, the Cinequest Film Festival, and the Brussels International Festival of Fantastic Film.  It was released on DVD and streaming in North America and Australia.

Production

Shot on location in Eastern Kansas in 2005.

Awards

In 2007, Suspension won the Spirit of the Independent Award at the Ft Lauderdale Film Festival.

Reception

eFilmCritic.com - "An indie masterwork straight outta Kansas."

MetroActive - "Alec Joler and Ethan Shaftel's finely made science-fiction/tragic-monster story takes a well-worn gimmick—a device that can freeze time—and comes up with an intelligent new angles on it."

References

External links
 
 

2007 science fiction films
American independent films
Time in fiction
2000s English-language films
2000s American films